
Gmina Dydnia is a rural gmina (administrative district) in Brzozów County, Subcarpathian Voivodeship, in south-eastern Poland.

Villages
Gmina Dydnia contains the villages and settlements of Dydnia, Grabówka, Jabłonica Ruska, Jabłonka, Końskie, Krzemienna, Krzywe, Niebocko, Niewistka, Obarzym, Temeszów, Ulucz, Witryłów and Wydrna.

Neighbouring gminas
Gmina Dydnia is bordered by the gminas of Bircza, Brzozów, Nozdrzec and Sanok.

References
Polish official population figures 2006

Dydnia
Brzozów County